Konstantin Aseev (October 20, 1960 – August 22, 2004) was a Russian chess Grandmaster and trainer.

Among his tournament successes were first at Leningrad 1989 with 9/13 (beating Leonid Yudasin and Alexander Khalifman among others) and second to Sergei Tiviakov in the 1992 Alekhine Memorial in Moscow with 6/9 (ahead of Vladimir Kramnik (whom he beat), Mikhail Gurevich, Vladimir Akopian and many others). He participated in many Soviet and Russian Championships, and played in the FIDE World Championship in 2001 (but was knocked out by Mikhail Kobalia in the first round). His last tournament was in St Petersburg in October 2003 where he scored 5.5/9. His final FIDE Elo rating was 2511; his peak Elo rating was 2591 in July 2001.

Among the players Aseev trained are Maya Chiburdanidze, Andrei Kharlov and Evgeny Alekseev.

Aseev died in St Petersburg after a long illness. On December 6, 2004, a rapid tournament in memory of Aseev was held in St. Petersburg, won by Evgeny Alekseev on tie break from Peter Svidler. All proceeds from the event went to Aseev's family.

Here is Aseev's victory with Black over Khalifman at Leningrad 1989 (moves given in Algebraic chess notation):

1.Nf3 Nf6 2.c4 e6 3.g3 d5 4.d4 Be7 5.Bg2 O-O 6.O-O dxc4 7.Qc2 a6 8.Qxc4 b5 9.Qc2 Bb7 10.Bg5 Nbd7 11.Nbd2 c5 12.dxc5 Nxc5 13.Bxf6 gxf6 14.Nb3 Rc8 15.Rad1 Qb6 16.Nxc5 Bxc5 17.Qb1 Rfd8 18.Ne1 Rxd1 19.Qxd1 Bxg2 20.Kxg2 Qc6+ 21.Nf3 Bf8 22.Qd2 Qe4 23.Qd3 Qxd3 24.exd3 Rc2 25.Rb1 Bc5 26.d4 Bb6 27.Ne1 Rc4 28.d5 exd5 29.Rd1 d4 30.Kf3 Kf8 31.Ke4 Ke7 32.Kd3 a5 33.Nc2 Kd7 34.Re1 Rc5 35.Re4 Rf5 36.Rf4 Rxf4 37.gxf4 Bc7 38.Nxd4 Bxf4 39.Nxb5 Bxh2 40.a3 Be5 41.b3 h5 42.a4 h4 43.Ke2 h3 44.Kf1 Kc6 45.Na3 Kd5 46.Nc2 Bd6 47.Kg1 Bc5 48.Kh2 Ke4 49.Ne3 Bxe3 50.fxe3 Kxe3 51.b4 axb4 52.a5 b3 53.a6 b2 54.a7 b1=Q 55.a8=Q Qc2+  0-1

External links

Konstantin Aseev at 365Chess.com

1960 births
2004 deaths
Chess grandmasters
Russian chess players
Soviet chess players
Chess coaches
Burials at Serafimovskoe Cemetery
20th-century chess players
Russian State University of Physical Education, Sport, Youth and Tourism, Department of Chess alumni